Brian Shaffer (born February 25, 1979) is an American medical student at the Ohio State University College of Medicine. On the night of March 31, 2006, Shaffer went out with friends to celebrate the beginning of spring break; later he was separated from them and they assumed he had gone home. However, a security camera near the entrance to a Columbus bar recorded him briefly talking to two women just before 2 a.m., April 1, and then apparently re-entering the bar without any evidence of him leaving the area. Shaffer has not been seen or heard from since. The case has received national media attention.

Shaffer's disappearance has been especially puzzling to investigators since there was no other publicly accessible entrance or exit to the bar at that time. Columbus police have several theories about what happened; some interest and suspicion has been directed at a friend of Shaffer's who accompanied him that night, but has refused to take polygraph tests regarding the incident. While foul play has been suspected, including the possible involvement of the purported Smiley Face serial killer, it has also been speculated that he might be alive and living somewhere else under a new identity.

Background
Brian Shaffer grew up in Pickerington, Ohio, a suburb outside of Columbus, the eldest of two sons to Randy and Renee Shaffer. He graduated from the local high school in 1997 and went to Ohio State University (OSU) for his undergraduate work. Six years later he graduated with a degree in microbiology.

Following that, Shaffer began studies at the OSU College of Medicine in 2004. During his second year there, in March 2006, his mother died of myelodysplasia. Shaffer's friends say that although he appeared to be handling it well, her death was hard for him.

During his time at medical school, Shaffer had become romantically involved with another medical student, Alexis Waggoner. She, along with their families and friends, believed that Brian would probably be proposing marriage to her later in 2006, most likely on a trip to Miami the couple had planned for spring break at the beginning of April. Tropical locations such as Miami were attractive to Shaffer; he liked the relaxed lifestyles. He told his friends that despite his decision to pursue a medical career, his real ambition was to start a band playing music in the vein of Jimmy Buffett.

Disappearance
On March 31, a Friday, classes at OSU ended for spring break the next week. Shaffer and his father Randy celebrated the occasion by going out for a steak dinner together earlier that evening. Shaffer's father noted that he seemed exhausted from having pulled all-nighters earlier in the week cramming for some important upcoming exams. He did not think Shaffer should go out with a friend, William "Clint" Florence, later that night as he planned to do, but did not express his reservations to his son.

At 9 p.m., Shaffer met Florence at the Ugly Tuna Saloona, a bar in the South Campus Gateway complex on High Street in Columbus. An hour later, Shaffer called Waggoner, who had returned to her home in Toledo to visit with her family before she and Shaffer were due to depart for Miami. Shaffer and Florence went bar-hopping, visiting several other drinking establishments and working their way down to the Arena District. At each stop the two had one shot each of hard liquor, according to Florence.
 
After midnight, Shaffer and Florence met Meredith Reed, a friend of Florence, in The Short North. Reed gave them a ride back to the Ugly Tuna Saloona, where they had started the night, and joined them there for a last round. While the three were there, Shaffer separated from his companions.

Florence and Reed attempted to find Shaffer, repeatedly calling him. They left with other patrons when the bar closed at 2 a.m., waiting outside for Shaffer. When he was not among the departing crowd, they assumed he had gone back to his apartment without letting them know. Waggoner and Shaffer's father both tried to call him later that weekend, but he did not answer. On Monday morning, he missed the flight to Miami he and Waggoner had scheduled long before. He was then reported missing to the Columbus police.

Investigation
Police began their search for Shaffer at the Ugly Tuna Saloona, the bar where he had last been seen. Since the area around South Campus Gateway was somewhat blighted with a high crime rate, the bar had installed security cameras. They reviewed the footage, which showed Shaffer, Florence and Reed going up an escalator to the bar's main entrance at 1:15 a.m. Shaffer was seen outside of the bar around 1:55 a.m., talking briefly with two young women and saying goodbye, then moving off-camera in the direction of the bar, apparently to re-enter. The camera did not record him leaving shortly afterwards when the Ugly Tuna Saloona closed; this was the last known time that Shaffer was seen.

It was possible, investigators realized, that Shaffer could have changed his clothes in the bar or put on a hat and kept his head down, hiding his face from the camera. The cameras might also have missed Shaffer—one panned across the area constantly, and the other was operated manually. He might have also left the building by another route. However, the building's only other exit, a service door not generally used by the public, opened at the time onto a construction site that officers believed would have been difficult to walk through while sober, much less intoxicated, as Shaffer likely was at the time.

Since Columbus has the most security cameras of any city in Ohio  more than Cleveland, Cincinnati, and Toledo combined  officers next looked to the footage from other bars to see if cameras there could explain how Shaffer had left the Ugly Tuna Saloona. However, footage from cameras at three other nearby bars showed no trace of him.

The search began to fan out from the Ugly Tuna Saloona, with officers, sometimes accompanied by police dogs, looking closely in the street, inspecting dumpsters and other waste containers, and asking residents if they had seen Shaffer. Flyers bearing his picture, showing a tattoo on his upper right arm of a stick figure logo from the cover artwork for the single of "Alive" by Pearl Jam, one of his favorite bands, and noting a distinctive fleck in one of his irises, were posted widely. Police even persuaded the city of Columbus to let them into the sewer system and search there. No useful information was uncovered. At Shaffer's apartment on King Avenue, six blocks from the bar, his car was still parked outside. Inside, nothing appeared amiss.

After searching miles away from the Ugly Tuna Saloona in every direction, police began to consider other possibilities besides an accident or foul play. Since Shaffer's mother had recently died, it was speculated he had gone away temporarily to grieve in solitude. Yet, his disappearance proved permanent. No evident reasons appeared for him voluntarily disappearing.

Those who had seen Shaffer that evening, including his father, were asked to take lie detector tests. He and Reed passed theirs, as did reportedly all the others, while Florence refused. The two women Brian had last been seen talking to were later identified; they said in 2009 that they had never been asked to take one themselves.

Waggoner called Shaffer's phone every evening before going to bed for a long time after the disappearance. Usually it went to voicemail, but one night in September it actually rang three times. "I kept calling it to hear it purely because it was one of the best sounds I have ever heard, even if no one picked up", she wrote on her MySpace page. Cingular, Shaffer's wireless provider, said what Waggoner heard may have been due to a computer glitch.

The police received many tips, none of which resulted in any breakthroughs in the case. At a Pearl Jam concert later that year in Cincinnati, lead singer Eddie Vedder took time between songs to ask for tips in Shaffer's disappearance, but none of those were useful either. Possible sightings in Michigan, Texas, and even Sweden were investigated.

Randy Shaffer, who had recently suffered the death of his wife, continued the search for his son on his own. A psychic he consulted told him Shaffer's body was in water near a bridge pier. He and Derek, Brian's younger brother, along with some other citizens who had become interested in the case, bought waders and spent much of their free time along the shores of the Olentangy River, which flows through Columbus adjacent to the OSU campus, searching in vain for the body near bridges. This possibility also led police to briefly consider the heavily disputed smiley face murder theory. Shaffer, under this theory, would be the purported serial killer's only victim whose body had not yet been found. Columbus police eventually rejected any connection to the alleged killer in Shaffer's case, following the lead of most law enforcement agencies, including the FBI, that have looked into it.

Death of Randy Shaffer 

In September 2008, during a heavy windstorm, Randy Shaffer was out in the yard of his Baltimore home clearing debris. A branch blew off from a nearby tree and fatally struck him. Neighbors found his body the next morning and called police.

After his obituary ran online, a condolence book was posted. One of the signatures in it said, "To Dad, love Brian (U.S. Virgin Islands)". This suggested Brian might have left Columbus for a new life elsewhere. However, upon further investigation, the note was found to have been posted from a computer accessible to the public in Franklin County; it was determined to be a hoax.

Subsequent developments
Shortly after Randy Shaffer's death, Neil Rosenberg, attorney for Florence, wrote to Don Corbett, a private investigator who has volunteered his time to help the Shaffer family find Brian, regarding his client's ongoing refusal to take a lie detector test. Rosenberg intimated that he had learned that the Columbus police investigating the case believed Shaffer was alive: "If Brian is alive, which is what I'm led to believe after speaking with the detective involved, then it is Brian, and not Clint [Florence] who is causing his family pain and hardship," Rosenberg wrote. "Brian should come forward and end this." Florence, he said, did not have anything to hide; he had merely told everything he knew from the beginning and did not see the value of doing so again."

Rosenberg's assertions notwithstanding, many of those who were close to Brian Shaffer have criticized Florence for not being forthcoming enough. "As soon as the detective started getting involved, that's when he pretty much had no contact with anybody," recalled Derek. "I've always thought he definitely knows something–just won't come forward with it." He believes it is still possible that Shaffer is alive, and Florence knows where he might have gone. "If Brian did take off somewhere, if that is the case, we just always had a strong feeling that Clint would possibly know that," he said. Waggoner also thinks that Florence is withholding information, but believes that it's likely her former boyfriend is dead and did not run off. "I can't imagine he would have just done that," she said.

In 2014, Columbus police said they were still receiving at least two tips a month on the case via the local Crime Stoppers hotline, though none had proven useful. The evidence in the case filled four boxes of files. One of the original investigators, Andre Edwards, told Columbus Monthly that after extensive review of the camera footage at the Ugly Tuna Saloona from the night Shaffer disappeared, which was intended to rule out the idea that he could have left in disguise, he could "say with 100-percent certainty" that Shaffer did not leave via the escalator. Police say they have three theories about the case but declined to discuss them even generally with the magazine.

In 2019, an image of an alleged American homeless man in Tijuana, Mexico bearing a resemblance to Shaffer began circulating online. Columbus news station 10TV forwarded the image to the detective in charge of Shaffer's case in 2020. The detective sent the image to the FBI for facial recognition analysis, which ruled him out as the identity of the man.

In March 2021, the Ohio Bureau of Criminal Investigation released an age-progressed photo of what Shaffer might look like at age 42, nearly 15 years after his disappearance.

Legacy
Between Shaffer's disappearance and his own death, Randy joined the families of other missing adults in Ohio in lobbying the state legislature to pass a bill establishing a statewide protocol for such cases. At the time Shaffer disappeared, it was left up to individual departments how to handle the cases, and some felt that investigations into their relatives' disappearances had suffered as a result. By the time Randy died, the bill had become law.

See also

List of Ohio State University people
List of people who disappeared

Other missing people who were last seen alone by security cameras
Rebecca Coriam
Andrew Gosden
Steven Koecher
Lars Mittank
Sneha Anne Philip
Tiffany Whitton

References

External links

Find Brian Shaffer, webpage set up by family and friends. Defunct as of April 30th, 2022.

2000s missing person cases
Missing person cases in Ohio
Ohio State University
21st century in Columbus, Ohio
2006 in Ohio
April 2006 events in the United States
Possibly living people